Seturam Shrestha (1891-1941) was a Nepalese musician, singer and composer. He was an important figure in the development of modern music in Nepal at the beginning of the 20th century, and has been hailed as an Ustad. In addition to songs of love, Seturam sang songs with messages of social reform.

In 1908, he became the first Nepalese artiste to record a song on gramophone disc. Among the songs he recorded in a studio in Kolkata, India was the iconic Rajamati. Janak Lal Shrestha, proprietor of Bhadrakali House, the main record store in Kathmandu then, sponsored the recording session.

Seturam has also been credited with pioneering ghazal music in Nepal. Ghazal is a poetic form with origins in ancient Arabic verse that expresses the beauty of love.

Seturam was born in Asan Kamalachhi, Kathmandu to father Krishna Dhar and mother Hari Devi Shrestha.

References 

1891 births
1941 deaths
Musicians from Kathmandu
21st-century Nepalese male singers